Ischnoleomimus is a genus of longhorn beetles of the subfamily Lamiinae, containing the following species:

 Ischnoleomimus arriagadai Galileo & Martins, 2004
 Ischnoleomimus excavatus Breuning, 1940
 Ischnoleomimus foveatus Galileo & Martins, 1996

References

Desmiphorini